Mandeville is a municipality in the D'Autray Regional County Municipality in the Lanaudière region of Quebec, Canada.

Topography
Prior to June 2, 2001, it was officially known as Saint-Charles-de-Mandeville.

The town itself is located along the Mastigouche River, just north of Lake Maskinongé. The municipal territory is dotted with lakes, many of which are lined with cottages. The northern portion is undeveloped and part of the Mastigouche Wildlife Reserve. Mandeville is considered a paradise for hunting and trapping (bear, moose, wolf, lynx) and fishing (musky, trout, bass)....

Considering the means of a « Wildlife Reserve », this paragraph should not put up front that it is a «paradise for hunting and trapping» but instead, propose that Mandeville is «considered a paradise for various precious wildlife, such as bear, moose, wolf, lynx and, fish biodiversity such as musky, trout, bass.

Mandeville is home to the Pléïades Observatory, managed by Centre d'Observation et de Recherche Astronomique Mandeville (C.O.R.A.M. Inc.).

History
In the early 19th century, the territory was part of the Hope Fief. This fief, with an area of 20,000 arpents (68.4 km²) was granted to Angélique Blondeau by Seignoral Lord Charles-Louis Tarieu de Lanaudière, but was mostly neglected by the seignoral lords. In 1824, one of the first settlers, Maximillien or Maxime Mandeville, arrived at the shores of the lake that today bears his name. And in 1837, further colonization occurred when a large group of settlers came from Maskinongé, Berthierville, and Sorel.

In 1894, the Mission of Saint-Charles-de-Mandeville was formed and became a parish in 1903. The name is most likely a reference to Charles Turgeon, pastor of the nearby parish of Saint-Didace, who worked extensively in Mandeville. In 1904, the Municipality of Saint-Charles-de-Mandeville was established and in 1905, its post office opened.

Since the toponym "Saint-Charles" had not been in common use for a long time, the municipality officially abbreviated its name to Mandeville in 2001.

Demographics
Population trend:
 Population in 2011: 2043 (2006 to 2011 population change: -8.0%)
 Population in 2006: 2221
 Population in 2001: 1878 (or 1962 when adjusted for 2006 boundaries)
 Population in 1996: 1824
 Population in 1991: 1725
 Population in 1986: 1538
 Population in 1981: 1392
 Population in 1976: 1240
 Population in 1971: 1240
 Population in 1961: 1236
 Population in 1950: 1378
 Population in 1940: 1250
 Population in 1930: 951
 Population in 1910: 1072
 Population in 1900: 551

Private dwellings occupied by usual residents: 1005 (total dwellings: 1770)

Mother tongue:
 English as first language: 1.1%
 French as first language: 97.7%
 English and French as first language: 0.7%
 Other as first language: 0.5%

Mayors
The mayors of Mandeville were:
 Séraphin Baril 1905-1906
 Joseph Dulac 1907-1908
 Joseph Prescott 1908-1913, 1916-1924, 1926-1932
 Amédée Sylvestre 1914-1915
 Joseph Charpentier 1925-1926
 Henri Pontbriand 1933-1934
 Albert Charbonneau 1935-1947
 Alcide Desjardins 1948-1960, 1963-1970
 Alfred Prescott 1961-1962
 Roger Dupuis 1971
 Donat Savoie 1972-1978, 1981-1983
 Réal Bilodeau 1979-1980
 Jacques Prescott 1983-1995
 Roland Rocheleau 1995-1999
 François Benjamin 1999-2007
 Francine Bergeron 2007-

Education

Commission scolaire des Samares operates francophone public schools, including:
 École Youville

The Sir Wilfrid Laurier School Board operates anglophone public schools, including:
 Joliette Elementary School in Saint-Charles-Borromée
 Joliette High School in Joliette

See also
List of municipalities in Quebec

References

External links
Mandeville - MRC d'Autray

Incorporated places in Lanaudière
Municipalities in Quebec